The first elections to the Ogmore and Garw Urban District Council were held in December 1894. Six members were elected from both the Ogmore and Garw wards making a total of twelve members on the authority.

The Council replaced the Local Board. All the old Ogmore members were returned but only two of the old Garw members.

Ogmore Ward

Garw Ward

References

1894 Welsh local elections
1894
December 1894 events